DeMarco Antonio Johnson (born October 6, 1975) is an American retired professional basketball player and former assistant basketball coach at Hampton University.

Early life
Johnson graduated from North Mecklenburg High School in 1993. He was an all-county selection as a senior.

College career
Johnson attended and played collegiately for the University of North Carolina at Charlotte. He redshirted his freshman year  before lettering in basketball for four years and was selected in the All-Freshman team of the Metro Conference. As a sophomore, he was a second-team All-Conference USA selection and then a two-time first-team All-C-USA selection. C-USA also named Johnson player of the year in 1998. He graduated with a bachelor's degree in criminal justice. With Johnson, Charlotte appeared in the NCAA post-season tournament in 1995, 1997, and 1998 and was the top regular season Conference USA team in 1995 and 1997.

Professional career
In the 1998 NBA Draft, he was selected by the New York Knicks with the 9th pick of the 2nd round (38th overall). In his brief NBA career he played in five games for the Knicks in the 1999–2000 season, registering 6 points and 7 rebounds.

Overseas, Johnson played professionally in Italy with Sony Milano (1998–1999), Scavolini Pesaro (2000–2001, 2002), Metis Varese (2001–2002), Lauretana Biella (2004) and Sebastiani Rieti (Serie A2, 2004–2005), in Spain with Etosa Alicante, and in Greece with Olympiacos.

In January 2006, Johnson signed with KK Union Olimpija of Slovenia.  In April 2007 he moved to the Israeli league and signed with Elitzur Ashkelon, where he played until the end of the season. In January 2009 he signed with Maccabi Rishon LeZion in the Israeli league. He played in the Israeli team Ironi Nahariya the next season and was waived in January 2010.

Coaching career
In 2010, Johnson became head coach of the basketball team of Providence Day School in Charlotte. The team won 18 games and made the quarterfinals for the first time since 2007. Johnson became an assistant coach at Hampton University the following year. He left the Hampton Pirates after the 2015–16 season.

Notes

External links

DeMarco Johnson's Statistics @ basketballreference.com
ACB profile

1975 births
Living people
AEK Larnaca B.C. players
African-American basketball players
American expatriate basketball people in the Dominican Republic
American expatriate basketball people in Greece
American expatriate basketball people in Israel
American expatriate basketball people in Italy
American expatriate basketball people in Slovenia
American expatriate basketball people in Spain
American men's basketball players
Basketball players from Charlotte, North Carolina
CB Lucentum Alicante players
CB Murcia players
Charlotte 49ers men's basketball players
Greek Basket League players
Hampton Pirates men's basketball coaches
High school basketball coaches in North Carolina
Ironi Ashkelon players
Ironi Nahariya players
KK Olimpija players
Liga ACB players
Maccabi Rishon LeZion basketball players
New York Knicks draft picks
New York Knicks players
Nuova AMG Sebastiani Basket Rieti players
Olimpia Milano players
Olympiacos B.C. players
Pallacanestro Biella players
Pallacanestro Varese players
Power forwards (basketball)
Richmond Rhythm players
Victoria Libertas Pallacanestro players
21st-century African-American sportspeople
20th-century African-American sportspeople